1968 neologisms
Quotations from film
Science fiction catchphrases it's a quote said in the movie Planet of the Apes